Jerry Charles Miculek Jr. (born September 7, 1954) is an American professional speed and competition shooter. Miculek has emptied a five-shot revolver in 0.57 seconds in a group the size of a playing card, thus being dubbed "The Greatest Shooter of all Time". Miculek holds five officially sanctioned world records in revolver shooting and over 15 unsanctioned records with firearms ranging from rapid firing pistols to the Barrett M107 .50 BMG rifle. Additional accomplishments include six shots in .98 seconds with a Barrett M107 .50 BMG rifle and a 1000-yard shot off hand with his 9mm Smith & Wesson revolver.

Miculek is also a gunsmith who tunes and adjusts his own firearms for optimum function. In addition to a channels on YouTube, he has a reality show, Shootout Lane on the Outdoor Channel.
Miculek worked as a millwright at Freeport Chemical for 15 years before becoming a professional shooter in 1989. He is married to Kay Clark-Miculek, herself a shooter with national and world titles. His daughter, Lena Miculek-Afentul, is also a shooter with IPSC world titles.

Miculek is endorsed by Smith & Wesson, who named the S&W Model 625JM model for him. In 2014, Smith & Wesson released the Miculek series Smith & Wesson Model 929 9mm revolver, designed in part by Miculek. Mossberg offers Miculek signature series shotguns and a rifle compensator of his design.

Biography and early career 

Born in Freeport, Texas, Jerry was a Texan for three days before moving with his family to southern Louisiana where he lived for the next thirty-seven years. Although he was the third born of five boys, Jerry Charles Miculek Jr. was named after his father after being born on his birthday.
Jerry worked as a millwright at Freeport Chemical for fifteen years before becoming a professional shooter in 1989.
At age 37, Jerry met his future wife, Kay Clark Miculek, the daughter of gunsmith, Jim Clark Sr., and a competitive shooter since age six.

Jerry estimates that in his lifetime he has shot over 2 million rounds of ammunition, which equals approximately 30 tons of lead.

Major accomplishments and wins 

Miculek holds over 100 national and world shooting titles including:

Two time Overall IPSC Revolver World Champion (2002 and 2005), and two time Senior IPSC Revolver World Champion (2005 and 2011).
Seven time USPSA 3-Gun National Championship
Four time National USPSA Multigun Champion
Four time 2nd Chance Bowling Pin Champion
1997, 2007 and 2011 American Handgunner World Shoot-Off Champion, and the only person ever to win this title with a revolver.
Twenty-one time International Revolver Champion
Member of seven time winning pro team at the Sportsmans Team Challenge
Eight time National USPSA Revolver Champion
Three time Masters International Long Gun Champion
Ten time IDPA Enhanced Service Revolver Champion
One time Bianchi Cup NRA World Action Pistol Metallic Champion

World records held 

Miculek also demonstrated the ability to fire five shots from a revolver on target with a S&W Model 64 ported barrel revolver in 0.57 seconds on September 25, 2003.  This is slower than the record held by Ed McGivern of 0.45 seconds (first shot on 9/13/1932, reproduced 4 times on 12/8/1932).  Originally recorded as "two-fifths of a second", the resolution of the timing equipment in 1932 was only 0.20 of a second, so the actual figure could have been anywhere between 0.40 and 0.45 seconds.

References 

 Fast and Fancy Revolver Shooting, Ed McGivern, 1938

External links 
 Miculek.com Youtube
 Miculek.com Official Site

1954 births
American male sport shooters
IPSC shooters
IPSC World Shoot Champions
World record holders in shooting
People from Freeport, Texas
Sportspeople from Texas
Living people